Konstantin Ushkov (born August 2, 1977) is a retired butterfly swimmer from Russia, who won silver medal at the 1996 Summer Olympics in freestyle relay. He also competed for Kyrgyzstan  at the 2000 Summer Olympics

References
 sports-reference

External links
 

1977 births
Living people
People from Lesnoy, Sverdlovsk Oblast
Russian male butterfly swimmers
Kyrgyzstani male butterfly swimmers
Swimmers at the 1996 Summer Olympics
Swimmers at the 2000 Summer Olympics
Olympic swimmers of Russia
Olympic swimmers of Kyrgyzstan
Olympic silver medalists for Russia
Medalists at the 1996 Summer Olympics
Russian emigrants to Kyrgyzstan
Kyrgyzstani people of Russian descent
20th-century Russian people
21st-century Russian people